Baekho or Baek-ho may refer to:
White Tiger (mythology) (Baekho in Korean), one of the Four Symbols of the Chinese constellations
Baekho-myeon, former township in Hampyeong County, South Jeolla, South Korea

Baekho is also a Korean masculine given name. People with this name include:
Yun Hyu (1617–1680), pen name Baekho, Joseon Dynasty scholar of the Southern Faction
Baekho (singer) (born 1995), South Korean singer from the boy band NU'EST
Kang Baek-ho (born 1999), South Korean baseball player
Kang Baek-ho, a character played by Kim Ji-seok on the South Korean TV show Likeable or Not